Suurisuren Munkhbaatar (born 1976) is a Mongolian international footballer. He made his first appearance for the Mongolia national football team in 2000.

References

1976 births
Mongolian footballers
Mongolia international footballers
Living people
Association football forwards
Mongolian National Premier League players